Riccardo Turicchia (born 5 February 2003) is an Italian footballer who plays as left-back for  club Juventus Next Gen.

Career 
Turicchia began playing youth football for local club Borgo Tossignano, and Casalfiumanese before joining Imolese, where he played for three years. In 2014, he moved to Cesena, before joining Juventus' youth setup.

On 9 October 2021, Turicchia made his unofficial debut for Juventus in a 2–1 home win against Alessandria coming on as substitute in the 63rd minute. On 24 October, Turicchia made his professional debut for Juventus U23—the reserve team of Juventus—in a 1–1 home draw against Pro Sesto, coming on as substitute in the 84th minute. He spent the 2021–22 season playing for Juventus U19, scoring eight goals in 39 matches, and helped the U19s reach the UEFA Youth League semifinals, their best-ever placing in the competition.

On 8 November, he renewed with Juventus till 2025.

Style of play 
Turicchia is a generous player. For this reason, beside his natural role of left back, he played several times as left winger and even central midfielder

Career statistics

International

References

Notelist 

2003 births
Living people
People from Imola
Footballers from Emilia-Romagna
Italian footballers
Association football fullbacks
Imolese Calcio 1919 players
Cesena F.C. players
Juventus F.C. players
Juventus Next Gen players
Serie C players
Sportspeople from the Metropolitan City of Bologna